William Kitchiner M.D. (1775–1827) was an English optician, amateur musician and cook. A celebrity chef, he was a household name during the 19th century, and his 1817 cookbook, The Cook's Oracle, was a bestseller in the United Kingdom and the United States. The origin of the crisp (also known as potato chip) is attributed to Kitchiner, with The Cook's Oracle including the earliest known recipe.

Unlike most food writers of the time he cooked the food himself, washed up afterwards, and performed all the household tasks he wrote about. He travelled around with his portable cabinet of taste, a folding cabinet containing his mustards and sauces. He was also the creator of Wow-Wow sauce.

The Cook's Oracle by William Kitchiner 

Kitchiner's most well-known book The Cook's Oracle, full title Apicius Redivivus, or the Cook's Oracle, was first published in 1817. It is also known as The Cook's Oracle: Containing receipts for plain cookery on the most economical plan for private families, etc.      

The Cook's Oracle includes eleven ketchup recipes, including two each for mushroom, walnut and tomato ketchups, one each for cucumber, oyster, cockle and mussel ketchups, and also a recipe for Wow-Wow sauce.

The book contains what may be one of the earliest references to crisps, in a recipe for "Potatoes fried in Slices or Shavings", which instructs the reader to "peel large potatoes, slice them about a quarter of an inch thick, or cut them in shavings round and round, as you would peel a lemon; dry them well in a clean cloth, and fry them in lard or dripping".

Life 
Kitchiner was born in 1778, the son of a prosperous merchant. His father's legacy meant he did not have to work, but instead was able to live on his own means. Although claiming to have been educated at Eton and Glasgow, he attended neither institution, but the link to Glasgow enabled him to claim to be a medical doctor (M.D.), a claim no-one checked.

His love life was chequered: he married, separated, and had an illegitimate son, whom he acknowledged and funded. He surrounded himself with like-minded individuals, setting up a "committee of taste" which revolved around dinners, hosted by himself or held elsewhere.

His dinners were renowned and made him something of a celebrity within a certain circle. He was very important for that reason. Unlike most food writers of the time he cooked the food himself (though not alone), washed up afterward, and performed all the household tasks he wrote about. In his writings he extolled the virtues of a ''magazine of taste'', a "pyramidical epergne" which could also be made into a portable traveling case, and which contained 28 different ingredients including liqueurs, spice blends, and proprietary sauces.

He died in 1827 of an apparent heart attack, the day before he was due to change his will to remove his son, whom he had decided no longer merited the legacy.

Other books

The Invalid’s Oracle
The Housekeeper's Ledger
The Traveller's Oracle
The Art of Invigorating and Prolonging Life
Horse and Carriage Keeper's Guide
The Pleasures of Making a Will
The Economy of The Eyes: For the improvement of the sight (also covers Opera Glasses, Pancratic Magnifier for double stars and day telescopes)
The Economy of The Eyes Part 2 : Telescopes
The Sea Songs of Charles Dibdin, ed.
books on singing and on choosing opera glasses.

Further reading
Dr. Kitchiner and the Cook's Oracle - Elspeth Davies 
Dr William Kitchiner: the Cook's Oracle: Regency Eccentric - Tom Bridge, Colin Cooper English

References

External links
 
 
 
The 'Cook's Oracle' at Foods of England
ECCENTRICITIES OF DR. WILLIAM KITCHINER
A VERY large portrait from the Dibner Library of the History of Science and Technology
Internet Archive info on The Cook's Oracle
Apicius Redivivus. The Cook's Oracle  From the Katherine Golden Bitting Collection at the Library of Congress

1775 births
1827 deaths
British inventors
English food writers